The Amazing Race: All-Stars may refer on these titles:

The Amazing Race 11, the first All-Star version of the eleventh season of The Amazing Race
The Amazing Race 24, the second All-Star version of the twenty-fourth season of The Amazing Race